Pieter Claesz. van Ruijven (1624 – August 7, 1674) is best known as Johannes Vermeer's patron for the better part of the artist's career.

Van Ruijven was born in Delft, the son of a brewer and a Remonstrant. In 1653 he married Maria de Knuijt. The couple had one daughter named Magdalena, born in 1655.  Like his father, he worked for the city institution, the Camer van Charitate (1668–1672). In 1657, he lent Vermeer 200 guilders.

In 1680 his daughter Magdalena van Ruijven married Jacob Abrahamsz Dissius, a bookbinder. His father owned a printing press on the Market square, close to Maria de Knuijt. Van Ruijven died in Delft, aged about fifty.

Maria had 20 of Vermeer's works in her estate at her death, inherited from her father.

De Knuijt died in 1682, one year after her mother. Her spouse inherited most of her wealth, including 20 paintings by Vermeer. In 1683, the estate was divided by Dissius and his father. In 1694 Abraham Dissius was buried, his son Jacob died the year after.

On May 16, 1696, twenty-one paintings by Vermeer were sold in an auction in Amsterdam. These paintings brought a total of 1,503 guilders, about seventy guilders each. It is presumed the paintings had belonged to the Van Ruijvens, who had built up a large collection of paintings by Vermeer, three by Emanuel de Witte, four by Simon de Vlieger and one by Jan Porcellis.

He is depicted as a predatory lecher in Tracy Chevalier's historical novel Girl with a Pearl Earring (1999), although there is absolutely no evidence of this. The 2003 film of the book also follows this characterization, with Tom Wilkinson playing him.

References

External links
Vermeer and The Delft School, a full text exhibition catalog from The Metropolitan Museum of Art, which contains material on Pieter van Ruijven
 http://www.bergerfoundation.ch/
 http://www.essentialvermeer.com/clients_patrons/dissius_auction.html

See also
 John Michael Montias

Johannes Vermeer
People from Delft
Dutch art collectors
1674 deaths
1624 births